Stanley Kevin Bates (born 8 October 1942 in East Finchley, London) is a British actor and screen writer best known for the role of Bungle, and as a scriptwriter, in the children's television programme, Rainbow between 1973 and 1989, series 2 to series 17. Other credits include roles in Alice's Adventures in Wonderland (1972), Theatre of Blood (1973) and The Tomorrow People.

On 10 March 2001, Bates was bound over to keep the peace following an alleged road rage incident. The incident occurred in May 2000.

References

External links

1942 births
British male film actors
British male television actors
British male screenwriters
Living people
People from East Finchley
20th-century British male actors
21st-century British male actors